Bidpay may refer to:
 BidPay, an internet payments system
 Panchatantra (also called The Fables of Bidpai), a collection of fables